Bret Garnett and Jared Palmer were the defending champions, but Palmer chose to rest in order to compete at Montreal the following week. Garnett teamed up with Mike Briggs and lost in the second round to Mark Keil and Christo van Rensburg.

Byron Black and Rick Leach won the title by defeating Grant Connell and Patrick Galbraith 6–4, 7–5 in the final.

Seeds
The first four seeds received a bye to the second round.

Draw

Finals

Top half

Bottom half

References

External links
 Official results archive (ATP)
 Official results archive (ITF)

1993 ATP Tour
1993 in sports in Washington, D.C.
1993 in American tennis